Mañana es primavera (English title: Tomorrow is spring) is a Mexican telenovela produced by Silvia Pinal for Televisa in 1982.

It starred by Silvia Pinal, Gustavo Rojo, Viridiana Alatriste and Ofelia Guilmáin.

Cast 
Silvia Pinal as Amanda Serrano
Gustavo Rojo as Alfredo
Viridiana Alatriste as Laura
Ofelia Guilmáin as Doctor
Norma Lazareno as Sonia
Gonzalo Vega as Bruno
Maria Eugenia Avendaño as Ma. Julia
Wolf Rubinsky as Raúl
Connie de la Mora as Emilia
Rafael Sánchez Navarro as Eduardo
Ramiro Oliveros as Rodrigo Oliveros
Lizzeta Romo as Alicia Baena
Rebecca Rambal as Adriana
Lily Inclán as Doña Eva
María Prado as Trini
Eduardo Palomo as Fernando
Adriana Parra as Carmen
Polly as Cecilia

Awards

References

External links 

Mexican telenovelas
1982 telenovelas
Televisa telenovelas
Spanish-language telenovelas
1982 Mexican television series debuts
1982 Mexican television series endings